Sirelius is a surname. Notable people with the surname include:

 K. J. G. Sirelius (1818–1888), Finnish missionary
 Ian Sirelius (born 1987), Swedish footballer